The Kaohsiung City Music Hall (KCMH) is a music hall in Yancheng District, Kaohsiung, Taiwan.

Architecture
The hall can accommodate up to 400 audience.

History
The music hall was opened in November 2000.

Transportation
The building is accessible within walking distance north east from Yanchengpu Station of Kaohsiung MRT.

See also
 List of tourist attractions in Taiwan

References

External links

  

2000 establishments in Taiwan
Music venues completed in 2000
Buildings and structures in Kaohsiung
Concert halls in Taiwan
Tourist attractions in Kaohsiung